Weasel Brook is a tributary of the Passaic River in Passaic County, New Jersey, United States. Weasel Brook flows west to east through Clifton and through Weasel Brook Park.

See also
List of rivers of New Jersey

Rivers of Passaic County, New Jersey
Tributaries of the Passaic River
Rivers of New Jersey

It flows generally west to east.